In enzymology, a ferredoxin—nitrate reductase is an enzyme that catalyzes the chemical reaction

nitrite + H2O + 2 oxidized ferredoxin  nitrate + 2 reduced ferredoxin + 2 H+

The 3 substrates of this enzyme are nitrite, H2O, and oxidized ferredoxin, whereas its 3 products are nitrate, reduced ferredoxin, and H+. Nitrate Reductase is an essential enzyme present in most biological systems such as green plants, certain fungi, yeasts and bacteria that aids in the reduction of nitrate to ammonium.

This enzyme belongs to the family of oxidoreductases, specifically those acting on other nitrogenous compounds as donors with an iron-sulfur protein as acceptor.  The systematic name of this enzyme class is nitrite:ferredoxin oxidoreductase. Other names in common use include assimilatory nitrate reductase, nitrate (ferredoxin) reductase, and assimilatory ferredoxin-nitrate reductase.  This enzyme participates in nitrogen metabolism.  It has 4 cofactors: iron, Sulfur, Molybdenum,  and Iron-sulfur. The Iron-Sulfur cluster ([4FE-4S]) in this enzyme has a variety of different functions that contribute to the growth of aerobic cells. Some of the functions include but are not limited to the following: involved in photosynthetic processes, electron-transfer reactions and the binding of certain substrates, resulting in activation.

Structural studies

As of late 2007, only one structure has been solved for this class of enzymes, with the PDB accession code .

References

Further reading 

 

EC 1.7.7
Iron enzymes
Sulfur enzymes
Molybdenum enzymes
Iron-sulfur enzymes
Enzymes of known structure